Events from the year 1586 in art.

Events
Flemish refugee Adam van Noort is commissioned by the County of the City of Coventry to produce a painting of local heroine Lady Godiva.

Works

 Anonymous – Portrait of Sir Henry Unton
 Giuseppe Arcimboldo – An Allegory of Death
 Federico Barocci – Vocation of Saints Peter and Andrew (Royal Museums of Fine Arts of Belgium)
 Hieronimo Custodis – Edward Talbot
 El Greco – The Burial of the Count of Orgaz

Births
date unknown
Giovanni Stefano Marucelli, Italian painter and architect active mainly in Tuscany (died 1646)
Orazio Riminaldi, Italian Caravaggisti painter of the Baroque period (died 1631)
Tiberio Tinelli, Italian painter of portraits of aristocracy, merchants, and intellectuals in Venice (died 1638)
 Luis Tristán, Spanish painter (died 1624)
probable
Massimo Stanzione, Italian Caravaggisti Baroque painter of frescoes (died 1656)
Nicholas Stone, English sculptor and architect (died 1647)

Deaths
January 25 - Lucas Cranach the Younger, German painter and wood-engraver (born 1515) 
May 9 - Luis de Morales, Spanish painter (born 1510)
date unknown
Francesco Camilliani, Italian sculptor (born 1530)
Pedro Campaña, Flemish painter (born 1503)
Giovanni Battista Maganza, Italian religious painter (born c.1513)
Matthias Zündt, German engraver (born 1496)

 
Years of the 16th century in art